Guichen has been the name of a number of ships of the French Navy named in honour of Luc Urbain de Bouëxic, comte de Guichen:

 , a protected cruiser launched in 1897 and struck in 1921
 , the rebuilt  Italian cruiser Scipione Africano acquired in 1948 and struck in 1961

French Navy ship names